Intergalactic Sonic 7″s is a singles collection, released by punk-influenced band Ash on 9 September 2002. It is available in two formats, with and without the bonus disc, Cosmic Debris. These are both available on CD and vinyl. It was released to celebrate Ash's tenth anniversary and collected the band's eighteen singles along with "Envy" a new song recorded specifically for the compilation. The American mixes of "Burn Baby Burn" "Jesus Says" and "Wildsurf" are included instead of their original mixes and a shorter edit of "Shining Light is included in place of the version featured on Free All Angels

It peaked at number three in the UK album charts.

The album features artwork by comic artist Pat Lee.

It was also certified Gold by the BPI on October 4, 2002.

Track listing
All tracks written by Tim Wheeler except where noted.

Main release
"Burn Baby Burn" (from Free All Angels) – 3:28
"Envy" (26 August 2002) – 3:35
"Girl From Mars" (from 1977) – 3:29
"Shining Light" (from Free All Angels) – 4:22
"A Life Less Ordinary" – 4:15
"Goldfinger" (from 1977) – 4:33
"Jesus Says" (Hamilton/Wheeler) (from Nu-Clear Sounds) – 4:44
"Oh Yeah" (from 1977) – 4:47
"Jack Names the Planets" (from Trailer) – 3:12
"Sometimes" (from Free All Angels) – 4:09
"Kung Fu" (from 1977) – 2:18
"Candy" (from Free All Angels) – 4:51
"Angel Interceptor" (McMurray/Wheeler) (from 1977) – 4:08
"Uncle Pat" (from Trailer) – 3:13
"Wildsurf" (23 November 1998) (Hatherley/Wheeler) (from Nu-Clear Sounds) – 3:29
"Walking Barefoot" (from Free All Angels) – 4:14
"Petrol" (Hamilton/Wheeler) (from Trailer) – 4:11
"There's a Star" (from Free All Angels) – 4:22
"Numbskull" (Hamilton/Wheeler) (from Nu-Clear Sounds) – 3:10
"Get Out" (Japanese release bonus track) (Hamilton/Wheeler) (from Trailer) – 1:29
"Cherry Bomb" (Japanese release bonus track) (from Free All Angels) – 3:17

Cosmic Debris
This bonus disc features 22 (23 in Japan) B-sides and rarities voted for by fans on an online poll.

"No Place to Hide" (from "There's a Star") – 3:36
"Warmer Than Fire"  (Ludwin) (from "Shining Light") – 3:07
"Where Is Our Love Going?" (from "A Life Less Ordinary") – 3:26
"Taken Out" (Hatherley) (from "Jesus Says") – 2:53
"13th Floor" (from "Burn Baby Burn") – 3:03
"Stormy Waters" (McMurray) (from "Wildsurf") – 4:42
"Message from Oscar Wilde and Patrick the Brewer" (a new reprise of a fan skit from "Petrol") – 0:30
"Who You Drivin' Now?" (Lukin/McLaughlin/Peters/Turner) (Mudhoney cover, from "Numbskull") – 2:02
"Stay in Love Forever" (from "Candy") – 3:41
"The Sweetness of Death by the Obsidian Knife" (from "Candy") – 3:29
"Melon Farmer" (Lowe/Peak) (from "Sometimes") – 2:01
"Nocturne" (from "Candy") – 3:31
"Gabriel" (Hamilton/Wheeler) (from "Shining Light") – 5:28
"Coasting" (from "There's a Star") – 3:30
"Lose Control" (Lowe/Peak) (from "Wildsurf") – 2:14
"I Need Somebody" (Hamilton) (from "Goldfinger") – 2:37
"Sneaker" (Hamilton/Peak) (from "Goldfinger") – 3:15
"Cantina Band" (John Williams) (from "Girl From Mars") – 2:54
"Astral Conversations with Toulouse Lautrec" (Hamilton/McMurray/Wheeler) (from "Girl From Mars") – 6:05
"Day of the Triffids" (from "Kung Fu") – 3:34
"Halloween" (from "A Life Less Ordinary") – 3:30
"Thinking About You" (from "Burn Baby Burn") – 3:50
"Bad Karma Blues" (Japanese release bonus track) (from "Envy")

Personnel
Arthur Baker – producer
Phil Thornalley – producer
Dave Eringa – producer
Chris Kimsey – producer
Owen Morris – producer, mixing
Alan Moulder – mixing
Rae Valentine – producer
Butch Vig – mixing
Ash – producer, engineer, mixing
Marc Waterman – producer
Miti – producer, mixing
Pat Lee – artwork
Rafe McKenna – producer, engineer
Mark Trombino – mixing
Mike Walter – engineer
Nick Fountain – assistant
Sophie Howarth – photography
James Brown – engineer
Nick Brine – engineer, assistant engineer, mixing
Ian Laughton – engineer

Ash (band) albums
Albums produced by Chris Kimsey
Albums produced by Owen Morris
2002 compilation albums
B-side compilation albums